Lukáš Dlouhý and Pavel Vízner were the defending champions, and won in the final 6–2, 7–6(7–4), against Albert Montañés and Rubén Ramírez Hidalgo.

Seeds

Draw

Draw

External links
Doubles draw

Doubles